Tim Gilbertson (born 1987) is a Canadian power pop singer-songwriter. He plays guitar, bass guitar, and piano. His musical influences include The Weakerthans and Modest Mouse.

Biography 
Gilbertson was born in Hinton, later living in Edmonton, Alberta, Gilbertson comes from a musical family, with mother playing piano and father playing guitar. Tim Gilbertson is the youngest of the children, and the only one not to have received formal music training. One brother, Eric, is a drummer and the other, David, is a rhythm guitarist. His sister is a music teacher.

Gilbertson earned a Master's degree in Geology and Geophysics from the University of Alberta, and runs a media production company Paper Tiger Media

Debut 
The debut Tim Gilbertson was released on Pop Echo Records in 2007. Produced and engineered by Andrew Shaw, the album was recorded in Burnaby, British Columbia, in July–August 2006. Gilbertson's brother Eric played drums for the album.

The critical reception was generally positive, with Exclaim! saying, "There’s joyfulness to his songs, from their nice, crunchy guitars to the unforced vocals, and despite a couple of weaker moments, this is an incredibly accomplished piece of work." Vue Weekly wrote, "The album is both melancholy and catchy". The Edmonton Journal'''s critic called the track "Palm Trees and Postcards" one of her top five favourite songs of 2007.

 Track listing 
All songs were written by Tim Gilbertson.
 "Palm Trees & Postcards"
 "Hot Damn!"
 "Analogue"
 "Get Going"
 "Bike Ride"
 "Wasting Air"
 "Long Walk"
 "Sick to the Stomach"
 "Kissin' Cousins"
 "Counting Stars"
 "All Our Guns"

 Palisades 
His second album, Palisades, was released on Pop Echo in 2010. It was recorded in Edmonton. The lead single is "Chipped Teeth".

 References 

 External links 
 Tim Gilbertson official site
 Tim Gilbertson on CBC Radio 3
 Tim Gilbertson album review (2007-08-02) in Fast Forward Weekly''

1987 births
Living people
People from Yellowhead County
Canadian rock singers
Canadian rock guitarists
Canadian male guitarists
Canadian songwriters
Musicians from Alberta
Writers from Alberta
21st-century Canadian guitarists
21st-century Canadian male singers